Jonathan Burrows may refer to:

 Jonathan Burrows (producer) (born 1942), American Broadway and film producer
 Jonathan Burrows (choreographer) (born 1960), British choreographer

See also 

 John Burrows (disambiguation)